Genesis Publications Limited is a British publishing company founded in 1974 by Brian Roylance, a former student of the London College of Printing. His aim was to create a company in the traditions of the private press, true to the arts of printing and book binding. Headed today by his son and daughter, Nick Roylance and Catherine Roylance (also a former student of the London College of Printing), Genesis Publications produces signed, limited edition books that are created in close collaboration with authors and artists.

First known for specialising in historical volumes, Genesis is now known as an art house publisher in the fields of modern music and culture. The company's first title to depart from historical reproductions was former Beatle George Harrison's autobiography, I, Me, Mine, published in 1980. The 2017 Extended Edition of the latter title, compiled by Harrison's widow Olivia, was the 100th book published by Genesis.

Bibliography

Beatles

 1980 I, Me, Mine by George Harrison (edited by Derek Taylor)
 1984 Fifty Years Adrift by Derek Taylor (edited by George Harrison)
 1987 It Was Twenty Years Ago Today by Derek Taylor
 1988 Songs by George Harrison by George Harrison (illustrations by Keith West)
 1992 Songs by George Harrison 2 by George Harrison (illustrations by Keith West)
 1993 Live in Japan 1991 by George Harrison
 1994 Liverpool Days by Max Scheler with Astrid Kirchherr
 1995 Paul McCartney: Yesterday & Today by Ray Coleman
 1995 Sometime in New York City by Bob Gruen with Yoko Ono
 1996 Stuart: The Life and Art of Stuart Sutcliffe by Kay Williams and Pauline Sutcliffe
 1996 Golden Dreams by Max Scheler with Astrid Kirchherr
 1997 Raga Mala by Ravi Shankar (edited by George Harrison)
 1997 From Hamburg to Hollywood by Jürgen Vollmer
 1997 BIG: Beatles in Germany by Günter Zint (with Ulf Krüger and Tony Sheridan)
 1999 Hamburg days by Klaus Voormann and Astrid Kirchherr
 2000 Mania Days by Curt Gunther
 2002 Playback by George Martin
 2003 Postcards From the Boys by Ringo Starr
 2003 When We Was Fab by Astrid Kirchherr
 2004 Concert for George by Olivia Harrison
 2006 Now These Days Are Gone by Michael Peto
 2006 Summer of Love by George Martin
 2006 A Day in the Life: Photographs of the Beatles by Michael Ward
 2014 Yoko Ono: Infinite Universe at Dawn by Yoko Ono
 2014 Photograph by Ringo Starr
 2016 Hello Goodbye: The Beatles in Tokyo, 1966 by Shimpei Asai
 2017 I Me Mine – The Extended Edition by George Harrison with Derek Taylor and Olivia Harrison

Rolling Stones
 1990 Blinds and Shutters by Michael Cooper
 1995 Masons Yard to Primrose Hill 65–67 by Gered Mankowitz
 1997 Crossfire Hurricane by Bob Gruen
 1998 Wyman Shoots Chagall by Bill Wyman
 1998 Wood on Canvas: Every Picture Tells a Story by Ronnie Wood
 1999 I Contact: The Gered Mankowitz Archives by Gered Mankowitz
 1999 Pleased to Meet You by Michael Putland
 2001 Exile by Dominique Tarlé with Keith Richards
 2005 T.O.T.A. '75 – Tour of the Americas 1975 by The Rolling Stones and Christopher Simon Sykes
 2015 How Can It Be? A Rock & Roll Diary by Ronnie Wood

Bob Dylan
 1999 Early Dylan (with Arlo Guthrie)
 2000 Dylan in Woodstock by Elliott Landy
 2006 Thin Wild Mercury by Jerry Schatzberg
 2008 Real Moments: Photographs of Bob Dylan 1966–1974 by Barry Feinstein

Pink Floyd
 2001 Psychedelic Renegades by Syd Barrett with Mick Rock
 2004 Inside Out: A Personal History of Pink Floyd by Nick Mason 
 2007 Taken by Storm by Storm Thorgerson

David Bowie
 2002 Moonage Daydream: The Life and Times of Ziggy Stardust by Mick Rock with David Bowie
 2007 From Station to Station by Geoff McCormack and David Bowie
 2012 Bowie: Speed of Life by Sukita and David Bowie

Others
 1979 Alice's Adventures Underground by Lewis Carroll
 1991 24 Nights by Eric Clapton; scrapbook by Peter Blake
 2000 The Greatest Live Rock 'n' Roll Band in the World: The Who Live at Leeds by Ross Halfin with Pete Townshend
 2000 Lovers & Other Strangers by Jack Vettriano with Anthony Quinn
 2002 Maximum Who by Ross Halfin with Roger Daltrey and John Entwistle
 2002 A Time to Live (with Michael Palin)
 2003 Killer Queen by Brian May with Roger Taylor and Mick Rock
 2004 Classic Hendrix by Ross Halfin
 2004 Rebel Music: Bob Marley & Roots Reggae by Kate Simon
 2005 Heroes & Villains by David Steen with Roger Moore
 2007 Elvis & the Birth of Rock by Lew Allen
 2007 California Dreaming: Memories and Visions of LA: 1966–1975 by Henry Diltz
 2008 A Thousand Things by Paul Weller
 2009 Ray Charles – Yes Indeed! by Joe Adams
 2009 Woodstock Experience by Michael Lang, Dan Garson and Henry Diltz
 2009 That Lucky Old Sun by Brian Wilson and Peter Blake
 2009 The Traveling Wilburys by the Traveling Wilburys
 2010 Jimmy Page by Jimmy Page
 2011 Faces, 1969–75 by Ronnie Wood, Ian McLagan and Kenney Jones
 2011 Six-String Stories: The Crossroads guitars by Eric Clapton
 2011 Sojourner by Ross Halfin
 2013 Transformer by Lou Reed with Mick Rock
 2014 Into Tomorrow by Paul Weller and Lawrence Watson

References

External links
 Official site

Book publishing companies of the United Kingdom
Publishing companies established in 1974
British companies established in 1974